"Wishing I Was There" is a song by Australian singer-songwriter Natalie Imbruglia, released on 25 May 1998 as the third single from her debut album, Left of the Middle (1997). The track was produced by Phil Thornalley and was co-written by Imbruglia, Thornalley and Colin Campsie. The single reached number five in Canada, Hungary, and Iceland, became a top-twenty hit in the United Kingdom, and broke the top 30 in Imbruglia's native Australia.

Background and reception 
On 25 May 1998, RCA Records released "Wishing I Was There" as the third single from Left of the Middle. Prior to this song's release, Imbruglia's first two singles, "Torn" and "Big Mistake" were major chart hits during late 1997 and early 1998. "Wishing I Was There" followed, but was less successful than her first two singles, reaching number 19 on the UK Singles Chart, number 24 in Australia, and number 40 in New Zealand. In Canada, however, the song reached number five on the RPM Top Singles chart in September 1998, becoming her second hit there after "Torn", which spent 12 weeks at number one between April and July.

In the United States, the song was not allowed to chart on the Billboard Hot 100 due to rules in place at the time but reached a peak of number 25 on the Billboard Hot 100 Airplay chart, where "Torn" had stayed at number one for 11 weeks. It also peaked at number 13 on the Adult Top 40 chart and number 15 on the Mainstream Top 40 chart. Elsewhere, the song charted in Belgium, France, Germany, and the Netherlands, but did not reach the top 50 in any of those countries. It did, however, make it to number 27 in Italy.

Composition 
"Wishing I Was There" is a song with a single version length of three minutes and 52 seconds and an album version of four minutes and 25 seconds. The song is set in the key of F major and has a medium tempo – 96 beats per minute – with a piano, guitar and vocal arrangement. Imbruglia is co-credited, with Phil Thornalley and Colin Campsie, for both lyrics and music.

Music video 

The music video was shot in parts of New York. Towards the end of the video, the now destroyed World Trade Center complex and parts of lower Manhattan are featured.

Track listings 

Australian and Japanese CD single
 "Wishing I Was There" – 4:25
 "Why" – 4:18
 "Big Mistake" (MTV live version) – 5:07
 "Wishing I Was There" (Transister remix) – 3:33UK CD1 "Wishing I Was There" – 4:25
 "Big Mistake" (live version on MTV) – 5:07
 "Why" – 4:18UK CD2 "Wishing I Was There" – 4:25
 "Wishing I Was There" (Transister remix) – 3:33
 "Impressed" (Tim Bran remix) – 4:08UK cassette single and European CD single'''
 "Wishing I Was There" – 4:25
 "Why" – 4:18

Charts

Weekly charts

Year-end charts

Release history

References 

1997 songs
1998 singles
ARIA Award-winning songs
Music videos directed by Matthew Rolston
Natalie Imbruglia songs
RCA Records singles
Songs written by Colin Campsie
Songs written by Natalie Imbruglia
Songs written by Phil Thornalley